Liberalism and conservatism in Latin America have unique historical roots as Latin American independence began to occur in 1808 after the French Revolution and the subsequent Napoleonic Wars that eventually engulfed all of Europe. French revolutionaries in the 1790s began an intellectual awakening called the Enlightenment, which opened the door for ideas of positivism in Latin American society and people in Latin America turned to liberal ideologies as liberalism means the idea of liberty, equality and popular sovereignty.

During the early 19th century in Latin America, liberalism clashed with conservative views as liberals wanted to end the dominance of the Catholic Church, class stratification and slavery. These issues for many years strongly affected the way that Latin American society was organized. The majority of liberals believed in a democratic system of government, but this system would create many changes and much confusion in Latin American communities in the early 19th century. On the other hand, conservatism favored existing systems and hierarchies. Conservatives believed chaos and social disorder would break out if the political system were liberalized. Latin American conservatives generally believed in class stratification and opposed radical change in government in Latin America.

The contest between liberals and conservatives in Latin America, while sweeping in effect, was largely fought between members of the landed, white or creole elite. Creoles were the children of immigrated European families. Systems in place from the colonial period—such as slavery, patronage by the elite and debt peonage—meant that the great mass of Indians, Africans and people of mixed race had little, if any power compared to the very small creole ruling class. Thus the concern that liberalization would lead to "disorder" that the conservatives spoke about is considered by some historians as a veiled or transparent fear of race war.

Caudillos soon came to power in some Latin American societies, such as Mexico. Caudillos were people of either progressive or conservative thought, who promised protection and restoration of traditional ways to the people. They were generally pragmatic, believing in a ruling system of what works best. Caudillos used military force to hold society together.

Since the 1980s, there have been several neo-liberal economic reforms across Latin America, in order to support expansive industrialization.

References

Further reading 
 Miguel Jorrin and John Martz. Latin American Political Thought and Ideology. University of North Carolina Press, 1970.

Liberalism
Conservatism in South America
Latin America